Tatatila is a municipality located in the mountainous central zone of Veracruz, Mexico, about 26 km from state capital Xalapa. It has a surface area of 82.25 km2.

Geographic limits

The municipality of Tatatila is delimited to the north by Altotonga, to the north-east by Tenochtitlan, to the east by Tlacolulan and Tenochtitlan, to the south by Las Vigas de Ramírez, and to the west by Las Minas and Villa Aldama. It is watered by small creeks tributaries of the river Nautla.

Agriculture

It produces principally maize, beans and coffee.

Celebrations

The celebration in honor of St. Peter the Apostle, patron of the town, occurs at the end of June, and the celebration in honor of the Virgin of Guadalupe occurs in December.

Weather

The weather in Tatatila is cold and wet all year with rains in summer and autumn.

References

External links 

  Municipal Official webpage
  Municipal Official Information

Municipalities of Veracruz